Sophie Robinson is a British interior stylist, designer and journalist. She is a guest judge on BBC 2's The Great Interior Design Challenge.

Education and career 

Robinson attended Kingsley School in Leamington Spa, Warwickshire. Later, she studied 3D design at Brighton University in the late 1990s, intending to become a product or furniture designer.

After graduating in 1997, Robinson moved to London where she had a workshop at Cockpit Arts, a social enterprise scheme which supports people to grow businesses. She initially began assisting with interior design projects to help pay her rent, which led to a career working on shopping pages in magazines before her first full-time job as an in-house stylist for the BBC Good Homes magazine from 2000 to 2005. She then became a freelance interior designer for eleven years in London before moving back to Brighton where she continues to work as a freelance interior stylist, designer and journalist.

Robinson also runs interior design Masterclass courses with fellow judge on The Great Interior Design Challenge, Daniel Hopwood and presents interior design videos on the YouTube channel Sophie Robinson.

Television 

For five years, Robinson was an on-screen designer for ITV's 60 Minute Makeover. She has appeared on Channel 5's Cowboy Builders. In January 2014, she became one of the judges on BBC 2's The Great Interior Design Challenge. Robinson left the show as lead judge after the third series to take a "complete career break" to spend time with her son, but was a guest judge during the fourth series. She was replaced on the show by interior designer Kelly Hoppen.

In 2022, Robinson began presenting a new show on Channel 5 (UK),  Dream Home Makeovers with Sophie Robinson.

Bibliography

 
Co-authored with Sophie Robinson, Daniel Hopwood and Katherine Sorrell

Personal life 

Robinson lives in Brighton with her husband Tom Pike, who is a builder. They have one son.

At the age of 21, Robinson became a rally driver after being encouraged by her father, Adrian, to take up the sport and competed in the British Rally Championship.

See also 
Interior design

References

External links 

  sophierobinson.co.uk

Living people
British interior designers
English interior designers
BBC people
Year of birth missing (living people)